Vampire Academy is the first out of six books in the worldwide bestselling series Vampire Academy by American author Richelle Mead.

This book chronicles the life of 17-year-old Rosemarie Hathaway, commonly known as Rose, a dhampir and her Moroi best friend Vasilisa "Lissa" Dragomir after being brought back to their school "St Vladimir's Academy" after being on the run for two years. 

The novel was adapted into a film, also titled Vampire Academy, released on February 7, 2014 in the United States.

Plot
Rose Hathaway is a dhampir, half-Moroi and half-human, who is training to be a guardian at St. Vladimir's Academy along with many others like her. There are good and bad vampires in their world: Moroi, who co-exist peacefully among the humans and only take blood from donors, and also possess the ability to control one of the four elements - water, earth, fire or air; and Strigoi, blood-sucking, evil vampires who drink to kill. Rose and other dhampir guardians are trained to protect Moroi and kill Strigoi throughout their education. Her best friend is Princess Vasilisa Dragomir (Lissa), a Moroi and the last of her line, with whom she has a nigh unbreakable bond. Rose is able to feel Lissa's emotions through her bond and can sometimes enter her body without Lissa knowing when her emotions are too strong. Rose and Lissa ran away from their school, the vampire academy, two years ago and survive through the use of compulsion and by feeding off of each other.  They had been moving from places to places, but this time, they got caught by the school guardians and returned to their school.

Reception
The book received positive reviews, with a Goodreads average of 4.19/5, based on  227,620 ratings. It was listed on the list of Quick Picks for Reluctant Young Adult Readers and recommended by Booklist, teenbookstoo.com, and Voice of Youth Advocates (VOYA). Vampire Academy was also voted number four after Eclipse by Stephenie Meyer, Harry Potter and the Deathly Hallows by J.K. Rowling, and Diary of a Wimpy Kid on ALA's teens top 10. The Vampire Academy series was also one of the New York Times Bestseller top ten in the children's books series division.

References

External links
 Richelle Mead's Official Website 
 Official Book Website Of Vampire Academy
   

2007 American novels
2007 fantasy novels
American young adult novels
American horror novels
American romance novels
American vampire novels
Vampire Academy series
Novels by Richelle Mead
American fantasy novels adapted into films
Novels set in boarding schools
Razorbill books